The 2001 season was the Minnesota Vikings' 41st in the National Football League (NFL). Despite having a 12th ranked offense, the Vikings finished 5–11 and missed the playoffs for the first time since 1995. Before the end of the season, the team fired head coach Dennis Green, who had become a polarizing force among the Vikings fan base despite his successful coaching tenure with the team. Mike Tice coached the final game of 2001, a loss to the Baltimore Ravens.

The season began in tragic circumstances when offensive lineman Korey Stringer died of heatstroke in training camp.

The season started off with a 24–13 home loss to the Carolina Panthers (which would be the Panthers' lone win). They did not win on the road at all during this season. Some season highlights included a 35–13 win over the rival Green Bay Packers in Week 6, and a Week 10 victory over the New York Giants in which Randy Moss pulled in 10 receptions for 171 yards and three touchdowns leading to a 28–16 victory.

This was Cris Carter's final season in Minnesota, having played 12 seasons there, making eight consecutive Pro Bowl appearances (1993–2000), all with the Vikings. He is the team's all-time leader in receptions, receiving yards, and touchdowns. He retired at the end of the disappointing season, but would briefly return to play for the Miami Dolphins midway through next season.

Offseason

2001 Draft

 The Vikings traded their third- and fourth-round selections (86th and 119th overall) to the New England Patriots in exchange for New England's third-round selection (69th overall).
 The Vikings were awarded two compensatory picks in the fourth round for the losses of Jeff Christy, Duane Clemons, Jeff George and Jimmy Hitchcock.

Undrafted free agents

Preseason

Schedule

Game summaries

Week 1: at New Orleans Saints

Week 2: vs. Pittsburgh Steelers

Week 3: vs. Indianapolis Colts

Week 4: at Miami Dolphins

Regular season

Schedule

Notes
 Intradivision opponents are in bold text.

Game summaries

Week 1: vs. Carolina Panthers

Week 2: at Chicago Bears

Week 3: vs. Tampa Bay Buccaneers

Week 4: at New Orleans Saints

Week 5: vs. Detroit Lions

Week 6: vs. Green Bay Packers

Week 7: at Tampa Bay Buccaneers

Week 9: at Philadelphia Eagles

Week 10: vs. New York Giants

Week 11: vs. Chicago Bears

Week 12: at Pittsburgh Steelers

Week 13: vs. Tennessee Titans

Week 14: at Detroit Lions

Week 15: vs. Jacksonville Jaguars

Week 16: at Green Bay Packers

Week 17: at Baltimore Ravens

Standings

Statistics

Team leaders

League rankings

Staff

Roster

References

Minnesota Vikings seasons
Minnesota
Minnesota